John Russell Rowland  (10 February 192531 December 1996) was an Australian public servant, diplomat and poet.

Rowland was appointed an Officer of the Order of Australia on 26 January 1981, while serving as Australian Ambassador to France.

References

1925 births
1996 deaths
Australian poets
Ambassadors of Australia to Austria
Ambassadors of Australia to Czechoslovakia
Ambassadors of Australia to France
Ambassadors of Australia to Morocco
Ambassadors of Australia to Hungary
Ambassadors of Australia to the Soviet Union
Ambassadors of Australia to Sweden
Ambassadors of Australia to Switzerland
Ambassadors of Australia to Vietnam
High Commissioners of Australia to Malaysia
Officers of the Order of Australia